Dancyville United Methodist Church is a historic church in the Dancyville community in Haywood County, Tennessee. The church and its cemetery were listed on the National Register of Historic Places in 1991.

The church property was deeded to the Methodist Church in 1835. Two years later, in 1837, the congregation was organized and a log church building was built on the property. The current building was completed in 1850, replacing the log church. It is a wood frame building in a Greek Revival design, built from trees growing on the church grounds; the lumber was hewn and sawed by hand. It is one of only a few extant antebellum churches in rural west Tennessee.

References

United Methodist churches in Tennessee
Churches on the National Register of Historic Places in Tennessee
Churches completed in 1850
19th-century Methodist church buildings in the United States
Churches in Haywood County, Tennessee
Methodist cemeteries
Historic districts on the National Register of Historic Places in Tennessee
National Register of Historic Places in Haywood County, Tennessee